Spezzatino is a second course similar to stew. It is made from low-grade cuts of veal, beef, lamb or pork which are cooked for a long time in a stew after being browned with butter, oil and/or onions and accompanied by sauces, vegetables and herbs.

In Italy 
In Italian cuisine, spezzatino is prepared by using veal meat, which is seasoned with potatoes and peas. There are many regional variants of stew throughout the peninsula. For example, in Tuscany is prepared a famous variant made with beef, carrots, celery and onions., in Umbria are traditional the spezzatini di montone (mutton) and roe, in Nuoro wild boar spezzatino is traditional, whereas in Friuli Venezia Giulia spezzatino is served with aromatic herbs and dry white wine.

Elsewhere 
Spezzatino finds counterparts all over the world, including Hungarian goulash, Makhan murg from India and Corsican stufatu.

See also 
 Beef bourguignon
 Carbonade flamande
 Chili con carne
 Gulasch
 Stew

References 

Stews
Meat dishes
Italian cuisine